Edward James Solomon (born September 15, 1960) is an American filmmaker. He is best known for writing the screenplays to Bill & Ted's Excellent Adventure (1989), Men in Black (1997), and Now You See Me (2013).

Life and career
Solomon began his career in college as a joke writer, stand up comedian, and playwright and, while still in college, was a staff writer for Laverne & Shirley – making him (at the time) the youngest member of the Writers Guild of America. He then spent three years writing the cult Showtime TV series, It's Garry Shandling's Show, and has helped create critically acclaimed hit franchise films in each of the past four decades, including Bill & Ted's Excellent Adventure and Bill & Ted's Bogus Journey (with Chris Matheson) (the 1980s), Men in Black (1990s), Charlie's Angels (2000s), and Now You See Me (2010s).

In March 2016 he completed production on Mosaic, a 12-hour long-form TV project for HBO in collaboration with director Steven Soderbergh, and worked on an early version of a Universal The Invisible Man remake, with Johnny Depp.

He married Cynthia Cleese, daughter of Connie Booth and John Cleese, in 1995. They have two children and divorced in 2011.

Solomon is Jewish.

Filmography

Film

Acting credits

Other credits

Television

References

External links
 

1960 births
20th-century American screenwriters
21st-century American screenwriters
American film producers
American male screenwriters
American film directors
Living people
People from Saratoga, California
American television writers
Film producers from California
Film directors from California
American television directors
American male television writers
Screenwriters from California
20th-century American Jews
20th-century American male writers
21st-century American male writers
21st-century American Jews